The MMR06 is a Russian rocket for meteorological experiments, with a length of 3.48 metres and a total weight of 130 kg. The MMR06 rocket was built in two versions: One version had a conical top, the second one, named MMR06-M, had a detachable free flying top, also called dart. The maximum flight height was about 60 - 80 kilometres. Between 1988 and 1992 62 rockets of the type MMR06-M were launched from the former NVA exercise area Zingst, in order to accomplish wind and temperature measurements in the upper atmosphere.

Technical data of MMR06-M

Total

Aerodynamic coefficients

Rocket engine

Dart

Parachute system

Launch sites

Ship
Musson
Ushakov

Land
Kapustin Yar
Molodyozhnaya Station (Antarctica)
Krenkel
Priliv
Volna
Zingst

References
MMR06 website at Encyclopedia Astronautica

Meteorological instrumentation and equipment
Sounding rockets of the Soviet Union
Sounding rockets of Russia
Meteorology in the Soviet Union